Rinda is a software library for creating modular and distributed co-operating services in Ruby using the tuple space or Linda distributed computing paradigm.

Based on a source code initially released to the Ruby community by Masatoshi SEKI in 2000, Rinda was later absorbed into Ruby's core distributed Ruby (DRb) module. Rinda has been distributed as part of the core Ruby library since Ruby 1.8.

Example usage

Rinda provides a framework by which multiple Ruby processes (which or may not be running on the same machine) can add, access and modify tuples (an ordered list of elements) stored in a shared data repository (the tuplespace).

For example, the following program creates a new Rinda tuplespace and initializes a DRb service that waits for requests coming over the network.

require 'rinda/tuplespace'

URI = "druby://localhost:61676"
DRb.start_service(URI, Rinda::TupleSpace.new)
DRb.thread.join

Using Rinda, other applications can poll the tuplespace for tuples that match specific criteria.

For example, the program below connects to a Rinda service and listens for any tuple composed an arithmetic operator followed two numbers (such as the sequence "+ 2 4") When such a tuple is discovered the program computes the result of the mathematical operation (for example, processing "+ 2 4" into  "6") and stores it in tuplespace.

require 'rinda/rinda'

URI = "druby://localhost:61676"
DRb.start_service
ts = Rinda::TupleSpaceProxy.new(DRbObject.new(nil, URI))
loop do
  ops, a, b = ts.take([ %r{^[-+/*]$}, Numeric, Numeric])
  ts.write(["result", a.send(ops, b)])
end

Finally, Rinda applications can add or remove tuples from the tuplespace.

For instance, the following program posts prefix arithmetic tuples to the tuplespace and reads back the result (posted by the program above).

require 'rinda/rinda'

URI = "druby://localhost:61676"
DRb.start_service
ts = Rinda::TupleSpaceProxy.new(DRbObject.new(nil, URI))
tuples = [["*", 2, 2 ], [ "+", 2, 5 ], [ "-", 9, 3 ]]
tuples.each do |t|
  ts.write(t)
  res = ts.take(["result", nil])
  puts "#{res[1]} = #{t[1]} #{t[0]} #{t[2]}"
end

External links
Ruby Standard Library Documentation for Rinda

References 

Ruby (programming language)
Inter-process communication